
Yalata may refer to:

Places

Australia
Fowlers Bay, South Australia, a town formerly known as Yalata
Fowlers Bay, the bay on which the town of Fowlers Bay, South Australia is situated
Yalata Station, a former pastoral lease associated with Fowlers Bay, South Australia
Yalata Indigenous Protected Area, a protected area in South Australia 
Yalata, South Australia, an Aboriginal community on the Nullarbor Plain
Yalata Anangu School, an Aboriginal school in Yalata
Yalata Mission Airport, a regional airport serving Yalata community

Elsewhere
Yalata, a crater on the planet Mars

Other uses
Yalata, a ketch operated by the Royal Australian Air Force Marine Section 
Yalata mallee or Eucalyptus yalatensis, a species of Eucalyptus tree found in Western Australia

See also
Yatala (disambiguation) for a common misspelling